Oft in the Silly Night is an American short comedy film released in 1929. It was produced by Al Christie from a story by Octavus Roy Cohen, part of a series published in the Saturday Evening Post and adapted to film in Christie productions. Among the early "talkie" films featuring an African American cast, the film survives and is available online.

The plot has a chauffeur sneaking out with his employer's car and daughter. The film and the series feature exaggerated "Negro" dialect and stereotypes.

The film was re-released on the DVD Birmingham Black Bottom in 2003.

Cast
 Edward Thompson as Temus Robinson
 Roberta Hyson as Mezanine Conner
 Arthur Ray as Julip Conner
 Spencer Williams as Eli Rubb
 Laurence Criner as L. J. Criner

See also
"Oft in the Stilly Night", a poem by Thomas Moore and folk song adapted from it

References

 "Oft in the Silly Night", pages 223-224, Slow Fade to Black: The Negro in American Film, 1900-1942, by Thomas Cripps
 Weird Wild Realm review - part of a review of 4 films packaged as Birmingham Black Bottom: The First All Black Cast Talkies
 Berkeley library brief discussion

1929 films
American black-and-white films
1929 comedy-drama films
Silent American comedy-drama films
Melodrama films
1920s American films